The 2014 Cottbus World Challenger Cup was a competition held in Cottbus, Germany from March 13–16 in Lausitz Arena. It was a part of the 2014 FIG World Cup Series.

Medal winners

Result

Men

Floor

Pommel Horse

Rings

Vault

Parallel Bars

Horizontal Bar

Women

Vault

Uneven Bars

Balance Beam

Floor Exercise

References

External links
  Official site

2014 in gymnastics